Doubleback may refer to:

Doubleback: Evolution of R&B, a 2013 album by Joe
"Doubleback" (song)
"Doubleback Alley", song by the Rutles, pastiche of Penny Lane, from The Rutles